Jon Bakero González (born 5 November 1996) is a Spanish footballer who plays as an attacking midfielder for Pontevedra. In 2017, Bakero won the MAC Hermann Trophy, an annual award given to the top college soccer player in the United States.

Career

Youth and college 
Bakero played college soccer for Wake Forest in the Atlantic Coast Conference, where he was a regular starter all four years. In total, Bakero made 88 appearances for the Demon Deacons, scoring 37 goals across all competitive matches. Bakero made his debut for Wake Forest on 29 August 2014 in a 3–1 loss against UCLA. A month later, he would earn his first points with Wake Forest, notching an assist against Akron on 30 September 2014, in a 2–1 victory. In the following match, on 3 October 2014, Bakero scored his first collegiate goal against Duke in a 4–1 victory. Bakero would score multiple times two weeks later.

During his sophomore year, Bakero improved on his freshman campaign and scored eight season goals, and would go on to earn Third Team All-ACC recognition. Between his sophomore and junior years, Bakero played for FC Tucson in the Premier Development League, a off-season amateur league that allows college soccer players to retain their NCAA eligibility while still playing competitively during the offseason. Bakero finished the 2016 PDL season with one goal in eight appearances for Tucson.

In his junior year, Bakero played an integral part of the 2016 Wake Forest team that earned their first ACC Men's Soccer Championship since 1989, and their first berth in the NCAA College Cup Final since 2007. Bakero earned All-ACC Tournament XI honors and College Cup Best XI honors. In between his junior and senior years, Bakero returned to the PDL where he scored five times in seven appearances for the Carolina Dynamo.

Bakero lead the Deacs in scoring for his senior year, where he notched 16 goals in 23 appearances. He helped Wake Forest successfully defend their ACC Tournament title, and reach the quarterfinals of the NCAA Tournament. He was awarded with First-Team All ACC honors, the ACC Men's Soccer Offensive Player of the Year and the Hermann Trophy, which is given annually by the Missouri Athletic Club to the best college soccer player in the United States.

Professional 
Ahead of the 2018 Major League Soccer season, it was announced that Bakero had signed a contract with Major League Soccer, making him eligible for the 2018 MLS SuperDraft. He was an expected first round draft pick. Bakero was selected by Chicago Fire SC with the fifth overall pick in the SuperDraft. Bakero made his professional debut on 14 April 2018 as an 85th minute substitution in a 1–0 loss to the LA Galaxy.

On 20 July 2018, Bakero was traded by Chicago Fire to Toronto FC along with $50,000 in General Allocation Money in exchange for Nicolas Hasler. He made his TFC debut in their 3–2 loss to NYCFC on 11 August. In 2019, he was loaned to Phoenix Rising FC  After the season, he signed a permanent contract with Phoenix Rising.

On 6 January 2022, Bakero joined Bulgarian First League club Slavia Sofia.

Personal life 
Bakero is the son of former professional footballer, José Mari Bakero, who played for the Spain national team, Real Sociedad and FC Barcelona. His aunt is Itziar Bakero, a former female professional footballer, and his uncles Santiago and Jon Bakero were also footballers.

Career statistics

Honors

Individual 
 Hermann Trophy: 2017
 ACC Men's Soccer Offensive Player of the Year: 2017
 Senior CLASS Award: 2017
 2017 First-Team All American (CSN, Soccer America, United Soccer Coaches)

Club 
 Wake Forest
 ACC Men's Soccer Tournament: 2016, 2017

References

External links 
 
 Wake Forest Profile
 PDL Profile

1996 births
Living people
Association football forwards
North Carolina Fusion U23 players
Footballers from Catalonia
Chicago Fire FC draft picks
Chicago Fire FC players
FC Tucson players
Hermann Trophy men's winners
Major League Soccer players
People from Sitges
Sportspeople from the Province of Barcelona
Phoenix Rising FC players
Spanish emigrants to the United States
Spanish footballers
FC Tulsa players
Toronto FC players
Toronto FC II players
USL Championship players
USL League Two players
Wake Forest Demon Deacons men's soccer players
Spanish people of Basque descent
Spanish expatriate sportspeople in Poland
Spanish expatriate sportspeople in Canada
Spanish expatriate sportspeople in the United States
Spanish expatriate footballers
Expatriate soccer players in Canada
Expatriate soccer players in the United States
Expatriate footballers in Poland
All-American men's college soccer players
Southern New Hampshire University alumni